Defense or defence may refer to:

Tactical, martial, and political acts or groups
 Defense (military), forces primarily intended for warfare
 Civil defense, the organizing of civilians to deal with emergencies or enemy attacks
 Defense industry, industry which  manufactures and sells weapons and military technology
 Self-defense, the use of force to defend oneself
 Haganah (Hebrew for "The Defence"), a paramilitary organization in British Palestine
 National security, security of a nation state, its citizens, economy, and institutions, as a duty of government
 Defence diplomacy, pursuit of foreign policy objectives through the peaceful employment of defence resources
 Ministry of defence or department of defense, a part of government which regulates the armed forces
 Defence minister, a cabinet position in charge of a ministry of defense
 International security, measures taken by states and international organizations to ensure mutual survival and safety

Sports
 Defense (sports), the action of preventing an opponent from scoring
 Defender (association football), an outfield player whose primary role is to prevent the opposing team from scoring goals
 Defenceman (ice hockey), a player, other than the goaltender, in a defensive position
 Defensive batting, a method of avoiding being out in cricket

Law
 Defense (legal), an attempt to avoid criminal or civil liability
 Defence of property, argument that a defendant should not be held liable for any loss caused while acting to protect their property
 Right of self-defense, the right for people to use reasonable force to defend themselves

Places
 Defence, Karachi, a neighbourhood located within Clifton Cantonment of Karachi, Pakistan
 La Défense, a business district near Paris
 The Grande Arche, commonly known as Arche de la Défense, near Paris

Other uses
 Defense (chess), a chess opening by Black
 Defence (ship), name of several ships
 HMS Defence, Royal Navy ships of this name
 DeFence, an art project
 Thesis defense, oral examination required for certain advanced degrees
 Defence mechanisms, unconscious psychological mechanisms that reduce anxiety

See also

 Defender (disambiguation)
 Biological defense (disambiguation)
 National defense (disambiguation)
 Protection (disambiguation)